Kārlis Bētiņš (27 October 1867, Bērzmuiža – 28 March 1943, Riga) was a Latvian chess master and composer of studies.

He tied for 3rd-5th at Riga 1899 (the 1st Baltic Congress, his brother Roberts Bētiņš won), took 3rd at Riga 1900 (won by T. Muller), won at Riga 1900/01, shared 1st with Karl Wilhelm Rosenkrantz, W. Sohn and Wilhelm von Stamm at Dorpat (Tartu) 1901 (the 2nd Baltic Congress), and tied for 3rd-4th at Reval (Tallinn) 1904 (Bernhard Gregory won).

In 1902–1910, he was co-editor with Paul Kerkovius of the Baltische Schachblätter.

After World War I, he took 3rd, behind Hermanis Matisons and Fricis Apšenieks, at Riga 1924 (1st LAT-ch). Bētinš played for Latvia in the 1st unofficial Chess Olympiad at Paris 1924 (+7 –4 =2), where he took 4th place (team) and tied for 4-7th in Consolation Cup (individual; Karel Hromadka won).

The Latvian Gambit (1.e4 e5 2.Nf3 f5) was named as a tribute to Kārlis Bētiņš, who analyzed it in the early part of the 20th century.

References

1867 births
1943 deaths
Latvian chess players
Chess theoreticians
Chess composers
People from Dobele Municipality